The 1975 Detroit Lions season was the 46th season in franchise history. It was the first season for the Detroit Lions at the new Pontiac Metropolitan Stadium in Pontiac, a Detroit suburb, which was built specifically for the team. It was also their first ever season outside Detroit since the franchise's move and name change in 1934; its first three seasons were played in Portsmouth, Ohio as the Portsmouth Spartans. For the seventh consecutive season, the Lions finished the season in second place.

NFL Draft 

Notes

 Detroit traded its third-round pick (91st) to Minnesota in exchange for S Charlie West.
 Detroit traded its fifth-round pick (119th) to Cleveland in exchange for CB Ben Davis.
 Detroit traded TE Dave Thompson and its first-round pick (13th) in 1974 to New Orleans in exchange for the Saints' first-round pick (8th) in 1974 and sixth-round pick (138th) in this draft.
 Detroit traded FB Leon Crosswhite to New England in exchange for the Patriots' sixth-round pick (141st) and eighth-round pick in 1976.
 Detroit traded LB Jim Teal to Los Angeles in exchange for the Rams' ninth-round pick (229th), and then traded this pick to Denver in exchange for CB Leroy Mitchell.

Roster

Regular season

Schedule 

Note: Intra-division opponents are in bold text.

Game summaries

Week 2

Standings

References 

 Detroit Lions on Pro Football Reference
 Detroit Lions on jt-sw.com
 Detroit Lions on The Football Database

Detroit Lions
Detroit Lions seasons
Detroit Lions